Sunizona is a census-designated place in the central portion of Cochise County in the state of Arizona, United States.  Sunizona is located approximately 10 miles to the east of Pearce along Arizona State Highway 181, near US 191. According to the U.S. Census Bureau, the population of Sunizona was 212 in 2019.

The median household income in Sunizona is $22,500.

Johnny Ringo, a famous Old West outlaw who was suspected by Wyatt Earp of having taken part in the attempted murder of Virgil Earp and the ambush and death of Morgan Earp, is buried near Sunizona. He is prominently featured in the 1993 movie Tombstone.

Demographics

References

Census-designated places in Cochise County, Arizona